Bài Chòi is a combination of arts in Central Vietnam including music, poetry, acting, painting and literature, providing recreation, entertainment and socialising within village communities. It was Inscribed on the UNESCO's Intangible Cultural Heritage of Humanity list in 2017. Bài Chòi was recognised as Vietnam's national intangible cultural heritage during 2014-2016 by the Ministry of Culture, Sports and Tourism.

Bài Chòi games and performance involve a card game similar to bingo, played with songs and music performed by Hieu artists, during the Lunar New Year, Tet.

References

Vietnamese culture
Intangible Cultural Heritage of Humanity